Qiddiya is an entertainment megaproject to be established in Riyadh. Construction started in the beginning of 2019. The project is one of the tourism megaprojects to be established in Saudi Arabia under the auspices of Saudi Vision 2030, which aims to diversify the income resources of the country and alleviate its reliance on oil. On 26 June 2019, the master plan for Qiddiya was revealed, composed of five primary projects. These projects include resorts, parks, and a city center. Phase one, slated to be completed in 2023, will feature Six Flags Qiddiya as a family attraction. 

The master plan is to create a project that overwhelms visitors with a variety of activities. Such designed experiences are planned to be provided in a way that takes in consideration the cultural, natural and professional aspects. Thus, the natural pattern of the site has been taken into consideration. By doing so, the proposed design will take visitors through a green belt network.

Etymology 
Qiddiya is named after a region which forms a slit at Jabal Tuwaiq to establish a hajj road between Al-Yamama and Hejaz.

The stated main idea behind the project is to establish a healthy, happy and engaging lifestyle place that is full of different opportunities and to encourage young ambitious Saudis who look forward to creating a prosperous Saudi Arabia.

Location 
Qiddiyah City or Qiddiyah project, which is supported by The Public Investment Fund (PIF), will be located 40 km away from Riyadh's city center. It will have a number of recreation facilities including, amusement parks, sport areas, car and bike riding paths, water parks, natural sceneries and cultural activities.

The project will provide jobs to many Saudi men and women as it will be capable to host global sport competitions and a wide range of activities.

By 2030 the project is expected to be the largest tourism destination worldwide, with a total area of 334 km².

Phase One 
The first phase of the project is planned to be completed by 2023. Upon the completion of this phase, 45 individual projects are to be completed. Moreover, 300 recreative, hospitality, leisure and sports will be launched.

Upon its establishment, Qiddiya need around 17,000 people to be run. Therefore, in order to hire qualified employees, a number of scholarships and training courses are being held. Thus, a partnership agreement was conducted between Qiddiya project and the University of Central Florida to train young Saudis on hospitality, tourism and sports management. Additionally, 60 scholarships have been opened to young Saudis in related fields.

Activities 
Over 300 activities will be allowed in the project, including grassroots sports, water activities, winter activities, safaris.

Qiddiya circuit
A motor racing circuit has been built in Qiddiya with a FIA Grade 1 standard with the expectation of holding a Formula One race or MotoGP race, possibly as soon as 2023.
However, Saudi Arabia was scheduled to host the Formula One race for the first time in Jeddah by the end of December 2021, before the completion of Qiddiya. The kingdom allegedly paid tens of millions of dollars to Formula 1, in order to win the hosting rights. The announcement, although not officially confirmed by F1, received criticism from human rights organizations for attempting to sportswash its image. In November of 2020, the Formula One Group announced that a grand prix would be held at the circuit in 2023.

Saudi Vision 2030 
The project comes to fulfill the Saudi vision to increase local spending. It is expected that such a project will contribute in returning  billion spent abroad by Saudis. Moreover, it is expected that by 2030 the total number of annual visitors will reach 17 million.

Landmarks 
The project will host a number of world-record hit facilities including:

 The fastest, tallest, and longest roller coaster.
The tallest drop-tower ride.
The largest Six Flags theme park.

See also 

 Dubailand

References 

Megaprojects
Planned cities in Saudi Arabia
Tourist attractions in Saudi Arabia

External links 
 https://youtube.com/@qiddiya-8668